Tannenberg may refer to

 Tannenberg, Saxony, a town in the district of Annaberg in the German state of Saxony
 Tannenberg, East Prussia, modern Stębark in the Warmian-Masurian Voivodeship, Poland
 Battle of Tannenberg (1410) or Battle of Grunwald
 Battle of Tannenberg (1914) in World War I
 Battle of Tannenberg Line in World War II, fought in 1944 in Estonia 
 Tannenberg Memorial, commemorating the World War I battle
 Operation Tannenberg, codename of an extermination action directed at the Polish people during World War II
 Tannenbergbund, a far right German political society founded by the German Army general Erich Ludendorff in 1925
 Tannenberg (minelayer), a World War II era German minelayer converted from civilian vessel, see List of World War II ships
 V 303 Tannenberg, a World War II vorpostenboot, served as a civilian fishing trawler pre- and post-war
 Tannenberg (film), a 1932 Swiss-German War film
 Tannenberg (video game), a first-person shooter released in November 2017 for Microsoft Windows, OS X and Linux
 David Tannenberg, a Moravian organ builder
 Führerhauptquartier Tannenberg, a Führer Headquarters
 Tannenberg (typeface), a Fraktur-family sans-serif type face designed in 1934

See also
 Danneberg
 Dannenberg (disambiguation)
 Tanneberger